Verrucaria rosula is a species of saxicolous (rock-dwelling), crustose lichen in the family Verrucariaceae. Found in freshwater habitats in Europe, it was formally described as a new species in 2013 by lichenologist Alan Orange. The type specimen was collected by the author from Cwm Dringarth, Brecon Beacons (Brecknockshire), where it was found growing on an unshaded rock in a flush. The lichen has a grey-green to brown thallus that is 40–200 μm thick. New thallus growth is initiated by tiny, roughly spherical or polyhedral granules that increase in size to eventually form somewhat circular, rosette-like patches; the species epithet rosula refers to this type of growth. Verrucaria rosula has been recorded in Wales, southwest England, Scotland, and France, where it occurs on damp siliceous rocks and stones near streams or on flushed ground. Lichens that associate with V. rosula include Ionaspis lacustris, Thelidium pluvium, Verrucaria cernaensis, V. hydrophila, V. sublobulata and V. margacea.

See also
List of Verrucaria species

References

rosula
Lichen species
Lichens described in 2013
Lichens of Northern Europe
Lichens of Southwestern Europe
Taxa named by Alan Orange